Philippe Foriel-Destezet ( - June 2021) was a French billionaire businessman.  He owns 18% of the Swiss-based employment agency Adecco.

Early life
He graduated from HEC Paris in 1958.

Career
He founded the employment agency Ecco in 1964.

With Klaus Jacobs, he was instrumental in bringing about the merger of the French agency, Ecco and the Swiss agency, Adia Interim that created Adecco in 1996.  He serves on the Boards of Adecco.

He stood down as co-chairman of Adecco in 2005, becoming honorary president in 2006.

He was cited in the Panama Papers scandal in 2016.

Personal life
He was married to Aline. They lived in London, and had four children.

See also
List of billionaires
French Rich List

References

External links
Forbes.com: Forbes World's Richest People

1935 births
2021 deaths
French billionaires
HEC Paris alumni
Businesspeople from Lyon